Tom Guest (born 5 July 1984 in Taplow, Buckinghamshire, England) is a former rugby union player, he played primarily as a Number 8. Guest could also operate as a Flanker.

He played junior rugby at Maidenhead Rugby Football Club, and was part of the U17 National Cup winning Colts side.

Guest was named Guinness Premiership man of the match against Sale Sharks on 25 January 2008. He was a member of the England Sevens team at the 2007 Dubai Sevens.

Guest was once tipped to be a future England number 8.

Guest was ruled out of the 2011 world cup with a urine infection.

He has been called into the England Saxons squad to face Italy A in Ragusa, Sicily on 9 February 2008.

Guest represented England Saxons at the 2008 Churchill Cup and 2009 Churchill Cup.

He was a replacement for Harlequins in their 2011–12 Premiership final victory over Leicester Tigers.

On 13 February 2014, Guest left Harlequins to join London Irish on a two-year contract from the 2014-15 season.

Guest was considered one of the fastest forwards in the world of rugby.

References

External links
Harlequins profile
England profile

1984 births
Living people
English rugby union players
Harlequin F.C. players
Rugby union number eights
People from Taplow
People educated at Sir William Borlase's Grammar School
Rugby union players from Buckinghamshire